Schaffhausen railway station is a railway station in Schaffhausen, the capital of the Swiss canton of Schaffhausen. The station is jointly owned by the Swiss Federal Railways (SBB CFF FFS) and Deutsche Bahn (DB), and is served by trains of both national operators, as well as trains of the Swiss regional operator Thurbo.

The station is a major intermediate station on the DB's High Rhine Railway that briefly transits Swiss territory on its route along the northern bank of the High Rhine between Basel and Singen. The station is also linked to the rest of Switzerland by the Rheinfall line to Zurich via Winterthur, the Eglisau to Neuhausen line that crosses German territory (some trains call at Jestetten and Lottstetten in Germany) to reach Eglisau and Zurich, and the Lake line to Rorschach via Stein am Rhein.

Train services

The station is served by long-distance passenger trains running between Zurich and Stuttgart (over the Immendingen–Horb and Horb–Stuttgart lines) and between Basel and Friedrichshafen. Trains of Zurich S-Bahn services S9, S12, S24 and S33 serve the station, with all but the S33 providing a direct service to Zurich. The S1 of the St. Gallen S-Bahn operates over the Lake Line to Diessenhofen, Stein am Rhein,  Kreuzlingen, Romanshorn, St. Gallen and Wil.

Trains run half-hourly, to and from Erzingen also in Germany, with a quarter-hourly service at peak times on work days running to and from Beringen calling at Beringerfeld and Neuhausen Badischer Bahnhof. Another hourly S-Bahn links to Singen (Hohentwiel). This route, nicknamed Rhyhas, was operated as RB service by Deutsche Bahn until 2022 but is henceforth operated by SBB GmbH using THURBO EMUs.

Summary of rail services at Schaffhausen station:

 DB Fernverkehr / SBB CFF FFS IC4: hourly  service between Zürich HB and Stuttgart Hbf.
 : hourly service between Basel Bad Bf and Friedrichshafen Hafen.
 : hourly service to Zürich HB.
 St. Gallen S-Bahn : half-hourly service to  via .
 Zürich S-Bahn:
 :

Bus services

Urban and regional buses stop at the station forecourt, providing regular connections to various destinations in and around the town of Schaffhausen along with destinations further away throughout the canton and principally without railway stations of their own. Most routes are operated by Verkehrsbetriebe Schaffhausen (vbsh).

Of the urban bus routes, line 1 is operated by trolleybuses, while the other municipal lines (3–9) are operated by either diesel-powered buses or battery-powered buses. Except for line 9 (Ebnat–Herblingen railway station–Einkaufszentren), all lines pass through or terminate at Schaffhausen railway station. Most lines operate every 10 minutes, with fewer services in the evenings and weekends. Line 1 is the fastest and most frequent bus link to the Rhine Falls. Lines 6 and 8 stop at Schifflände (departures of boats of Schweizerische Schifffahrtsgesellschaft Untersee und Rhein to Kreuzlingen, Lake Constance)

Some destinations outside of the town of Schaffhausen are also served by vbsh (regional lines 21–28, of which only lines 21–25 serve Schaffhausen railway station). Bargen, Büttenhardt and Hemmental are all served hourly. There is also an hourly bus service to the village of Ramsen. The service also runs half-hourly between Schaffhausen station and Dörflingen, which does not have a railway station. The bus route to Ramsen crosses the Swiss-German border four times, entering and exiting German territory twice, calling at the village of Büsingen am Hochrhein which is an exclave of Germany entirely surrounded by Swiss territory and its outlying village Stemmer, both locations however lie within the Swiss customs area. The service also calls at Randegg and Murbach in Germany.

Two additional bus services, operated by Postauto, connect Schaffhausen station to villages in the neighbouring canton of Zurich, both calling at the Rhymarkt shopping centre located in Feuerthalen on the opposite bank of the River Rhine.

Nighttime bus service
During weekends, there are several night bus services connecting Schaffhausen railway station with destinations in the municipalities of Schaffhausen and Neuhausen am Rheinfall, and with villages in the canton of Schaffhausen. Night bus lines are designated with an "N" followed by the respective route number (all are operated by Verkehrsbetriebe Schaffhausen, vbsh).

Facilities
The station has two ticket offices, one for local tickets and passes and one for the national and international railway ticket sales and services. The station also offers a range of shopping facilities on two levels with various supermarkets, shops, bakeries and eateries as well as a chemist, located within the complex.

Customs
Schaffhausen is, for customs purposes, a border station for passengers arriving from Germany using direct services without intermediate stops. Customs checks may be performed in Schaffhausen station by Swiss officials. Systematic passport controls were abolished when Switzerland joined the Schengen Area in 2008.

References

External links
 
 
 Interactive station plan (Schaffhausen)

Schaffhausen
Schaffhausen
Schaffhausen